The 2018–19 North Dakota State Bison women's basketball represent North Dakota State University in the 2018–19 NCAA Division I women's basketball season. The Bison, led fifth year head by Maren Walseth, play their home games at the Scheels Center and were members of The Summit League. They finished the season 7–22, 4–12 in Summit League play to finish in seventh place. They lost in the quarterfinals of the Summit League women's tournament to South Dakota.

Walseth and NDSU mutually agreed to part ways on March 11 after 5 seasons. The Bison went 40–106 overall in Walseth's tenure.

Roster

Schedule

|-
!colspan=9 style=| Exhibition

|-
!colspan=9 style=| Regular season

|-
!colspan=9 style=| The Summit League Women's Tournament

See also
 2018–19 North Dakota State Bison men's basketball team

References

North Dakota State Bison women's basketball seasons
North Dakota State
Fight
Fight